Nderim Nexhipi (born 22 May 1984) is a Macedonian football player of Albanian ethnicity now retired from football and working as a Sports Director at the current Champions of Kosovo FC Ballkani  in the Kosovo Superliga. After a 17 years of professional football and more than 300 games in some different countries of Europe he decided to stop with his football activity. From Sloga Jugomagnat to Hertha BSC -- Wolfsburg , from Rabotnicki to Lierse , From Lierse to Qarabag he had some great teams during his career. He also holds Albanian citizenship.

Club career

When he was 7 years old he joined his first football club, Sloga Jugomagnat Skopje, where he proved to be very talented. Eventually Nexhipi was noticed by talent scouts at the Macedonia – 21. At the age of 17 and after a training week at Hertha Berlin, he received a professional contract 2001–2003. During the first season under coach Jürgen Röber, he played several matches for the German Cup and he was twice in the selection for the league. Huub Stevens took the helm on then but gave no Nexhipi opportunities, partly because of injuries. At the request of Röber Nexhipi moved in 2003 to VfL Wolfsburg. Rober, however, was dismissed after six months and replaced by Eric Gerets, but he did not Nexhipi aside.

However, the midfielder went back to Macedonia in 2004. After a disagreement and misunderstanding between managers Nexhipi went to work at FK Vardar Skopje . There he was quickly taken away by coach Gjore Jovanovski of FK Rabotnički Kometal Skopje who absolutely wanted to. He has worked with the youth team player at his Sloga Jugomagnat.

His stay at Rabotnički Kometal was a success. The club played with him in the team championship three times in four years. In 2008 also brought the national cup, in the final was 2–0, both goals from Nexhipi. The interest from Western Europe grew back, particularly in Belgium. During the summer of 2008 there were discussions with RC Genk, Lokeren and Lierse SK. Ultimately chose the Macedonian for the latter. Somewhat surprising given Lierse in the Second Division came out but the board, led by Maged Samy, could convince him by the ambitions of the club. Early January 2011 and decided Lierse Nexhipi to break their contract.

After Belgium Nexhipi played for 18 months in the Azerbaijani club Qarabağ FK.

Vaslui

In February 2013, Nexhipi signed a 2,5 years contract with Vaslui. He made his Liga I debut on 25 February in the clash against Cluj, appearing as a substitute for Cauê in 70th minute. During the second part of the season, Nexhipi struggled to gain a place in the starting lineup and ended the season with seven league appearances, where he started in only one of them, collecting only 148 minutes. He terminated his contract with the club after the end of the season.

Partizani Tirana

On 31 January 2014, Nexhipi was signed by Albanian Superliga side Partizani Tirana, signing a contract until the end of the season with an option to extend it for another season. On 7 February 2014, he made his debut in Tirana derby I against the cross-town rivals of Tirana, playing in the last 35 minutes of a 1–0 loss at Qemal Stafa Stadium.

On 8 March, Nexhipi scored his first Albanian Superliga goal, netting an added-time equaliser for a 1–1 draw against Teuta Durrës at Niko Dovana Stadium. Four days later, Nexhipi was again in the scoresheet as he scored a penalty kick against Bylis Ballsh in an eventual 2–0 home win. On 16 March, Nexhipi continued with his solid performances as he scored again from the penalty spot against Vllaznia Shkodër, which was proved to be the winner. Six days later, in the last derby of the season, Nexhipi scored another last-minute equaliser in the 93rd minute.

Following that, on 10 May 2014, he scored his first brace of the season, both with penalties, in a 2–4 away win over Lushnja. Nexhipi ended his first season with Partizani in strong fashion, playing 15 matches and scored 6 goals, helping the club to finish 5th in its return season in Albanian Superliga, failing to earn a spot in European cups for the next season. After the end of the season, he extended his contract for another season.

For the 2014–15 season, Nexhipi was named the new capitan of Partizani Tirana after the goalkeeper Alban Hoxha decided to handed his captaincy to him, and became the vice-captain instead. He played his first match of the season in the opening day of 2014–15 Albanian Superliga season, where Partizani didn't go more than a 1–1 draw away against Laçi. In next match, away against Apolonia, he missed a penalty kick, with Partizani who lose the match 1–0 at Loni Papuçiu Stadium, he was stripped of his penalty duties by manager Shpëtim Duro.

Flamurtari Vlorë

On 26 July 2015, Nexhipi was signed by fellow Albanian Superliga side Flamurtari Vlorë on a 1+1 deal, taking the number 10 for the upcoming 2014–15 season. He was presented to the media in the very next day, where he thanked the club directors and fans for making this transfer possible, also refusing to comment his departure from Partizani.

Third spell at Shkëndija

After six unsuccessful months with Flamurtari Vlorë in Albanian Superliga, where the club struggled for results and ended the first part of the season in 7th place, Nexhipi terminated his contract with the club and returned to his home country where he signed an 18-month contract with Shkëndija of Macedonian First Football League, returning for the third time. He was presented on 11 January 2016 along with the new signings Stephan Vujčić, Alem Merajić and Kostadin Zahov.

Sports Director FK Kukësi

After retiring from football in the summer of 2017 he worked as Sport Analyst at SuperSport Albania,  and only after few months he got an offer to take over as a Sports Director with the current Champions in Albania FK Kukësi.

International career

He made his official debut with Macedonia on 14 December 2012, playing 75 minutes in a 4–1 away lose in a friendly match against Poland. That has his only cap for Macedonia, and, being an ethnic Albanian, he has awaken the interest of the Albanian Football Association to be part of Albania. Nexhipi has expressed his interest and has declared that he would make himself available should he receive a call-up.

Honours

Club
Sloga Jugomagnat
Macedonian First League: 2000–01
Macedonian Football Cup: 2000–01

Rabotnički
Macedonian First League: 2005–06, 2007–08
Macedonian Football Cup: 2007–08

Shkëndija
Macedonian Football Cup: 2015–16

Hertha BSC 
German League Cup:
2001-02

References

External links

Nderim Nexhipi at the MacedonianFootball 
Nderim Nexhipi at the Liga1.ro 
Nderim Nexhipi at the FSHF

1984 births
Living people
Footballers from Skopje
Albanians in North Macedonia
Association football midfielders
Macedonian footballers
North Macedonia youth international footballers
North Macedonia under-21 international footballers
North Macedonia international footballers
FK Sloga Jugomagnat players
Hertha BSC II players
FK Vardar players
FK Rabotnički players
Lierse S.K. players
Qarabağ FK players
KF Shkëndija players
FC Vaslui players
FK Partizani Tirana players
Flamurtari Vlorë players
KF Korabi Peshkopi players
FC Drita players
Macedonian First Football League players
Regionalliga players
Challenger Pro League players
Belgian Pro League players
Azerbaijan Premier League players
Liga I players
Kategoria Superiore players
Football Superleague of Kosovo players
Macedonian expatriate footballers
Expatriate footballers in Germany
Macedonian expatriate sportspeople in Germany
Expatriate footballers in Belgium
Macedonian expatriate sportspeople in Belgium
Expatriate footballers in Azerbaijan
Macedonian expatriate sportspeople in Azerbaijan
Expatriate footballers in Romania
Macedonian expatriate sportspeople in Romania
Expatriate footballers in Albania
Macedonian expatriate sportspeople in Albania